Lindsay Alcock (born October 6, 1977) is a Canadian skeleton racer who has competed since 1998. She won a silver medal in the women's skeleton event at the 2004 FIBT World Championships in Königssee.

Competing in two Winter Olympics, Alcock earned her best finish of sixth in the women's skeleton event at Salt Lake City in 2002. She won the women's Skeleton World Cup overall title in 2003-4.

A native of Calgary, Alberta, Alcock also does motivational speaking.

References
 2002 women's skeleton results
 2006 women's skeleton results
 FIBT profile
 List of women's skeleton World Cup champions since 1997.
 Official website
 Prospeak.com profile of Alcock
 Women's skeleton world championship medalists since 2000

External links
 

1977 births
Canadian female skeleton racers
Living people
Sportspeople from Calgary
Skeleton racers at the 2002 Winter Olympics
Skeleton racers at the 2006 Winter Olympics
Olympic skeleton racers of Canada
20th-century Canadian women
21st-century Canadian women